The 1953 Michigan State Spartans football team represented Michigan State College in the 1953 Big Ten Conference football season. This was the Spartans' inaugural season in the Big Ten Conference and share the conference title with Illinois with a 5–1 record. They represented the Big Ten in the Rose Bowl, defeated UCLA, 28–20, and finished ranked third in both the AP and Coaches polls.

Schedule

References

Michigan State
Michigan State Spartans football seasons
Big Ten Conference football champion seasons
Rose Bowl champion seasons
Michigan State Spartans football